This is a listing of official releases by Chase & Status, an English drum and bass production duo from London consisting of Saul Milton and Will Kennard.

Chase & Status had three number one singles on the UK Dance Chart between 2007 – 2009; the double A-side "Hurt You" / "Sell Me Your Soul" in 2007 and "Take Me Away" / "Judgement (Informer)" in 2008 were two of them. On 5 October 2008, they reached number seventy on the UK Singles Chart and number one on the UK Dance Chart again with their single "Pieces" featuring vocals from Plan B. In 2009, they peaked at number forty five with "Against All Odds", which featured UK rapper Kano. After this, Chase & Status' style changed from more 'liquid' drum and bass songs, such as "Take U There" (featuring Digga), to a more commercialised sound, reminiscent of club/dance music. Chase & Status' first album, More than Alot, debuted on the UK Albums Chart at number forty nine in October 2008 and the UK Dance Album Chart at number two.

In November 2009, the duo entered the top forty of the UK Singles Chart for the first time with the track "End Credits". The track was released on 2 November 2009 and featuring Plan B, it reached a peak of number nine on the UK Singles Chart. The duo then released "Let You Go" on 15 August 2010, revealing it to be the second official single to be released from their second studio album No More Idols. The single featured vocals from Mali and debuted at number eleven on the UK Singles Chart, marking the duo's second consecutive top 40 hit. The fourth single from the album is "Blind Faith", which features soul singer and songwriter Liam Bailey and was released in January 2011. Other singles include "Time" (featuring Delilah), "Hitz" (featuring Tinie Tempah) and "Flashing Lights" (with Sub Focus featuring Takura). The album debuted at number two on the UK Albums Chart and was certified gold in the first week of sales by the British Phonographic Industry.

The lead single from their third studio album Brand New Machine, entitled "Lost & Not Found", features Louis M^ttrs and was released on 26 June. The album's second single "Count on Me" featuring Moko premiered on B.Traits' BBC Radio 1. It was released on 29 September, reaching number five in the UK Singles Chart. The album was released on 7 October. The third single from Brand New Machine, "Alive", was released on 15 December 2013. It peaked at number 21 on the UK Singles Chart. The album's fourth single, "Blk & Blu", features vocals from Ed Thomas and was released on 24 March 2014.

Albums

Studio albums

Mixtapes

Extended plays

Singles

As lead artist

Promotional singles

Other charted and certified songs

Production discography

Productions

Remixes

References

Footnotes

Sources

Discography
Discographies of British artists